Ronald ("Ronaldo") Lanzoni Campos (born August 21, 1959) is a retired long-distance runner from Costa Rica. He claimed the silver medal at the 1987 Pan American Games in the Men's Marathon, and twice represented his native country at the Summer Olympics (1984 and 1988). He set his personal best (2:14.33) in the classic distance in 1987.

Achievements

See also
Costa Rican records in athletics

References
 sports-reference

1959 births
Living people
Costa Rican male long-distance runners
Athletes (track and field) at the 1984 Summer Olympics
Athletes (track and field) at the 1988 Summer Olympics
Athletes (track and field) at the 1987 Pan American Games
Olympic athletes of Costa Rica
Pan American Games medalists in athletics (track and field)
Pan American Games silver medalists for Costa Rica
Medalists at the 1987 Pan American Games
20th-century Costa Rican people
21st-century Costa Rican people